A pirate code, pirate articles, or articles of agreement were a code of conduct for governing pirates. A group of sailors, on turning pirate, would draw up their own code or articles, which provided rules for discipline, division of stolen goods, and compensation for injured pirates. Breaking the code could get a pirate marooned or killed.

History

The first set of the "Pirate's Code" was supposedly written by the Portuguese buccaneer Bartolomeu Português sometime in the early 1660s, but the first recorded set belonged to George Cusack who was active from 1668 to 1675. These early buccaneer articles were based on earlier maritime law and privateer codes such as the 12th century Roles of Oleron. They were later used by buccaneers and pirates such as John Phillips, Edward Low and Bartholomew Roberts.
Buccaneers operated under a ship's articles that, among other things, governed conduct of the crew. These "articles of agreement" became authority independent of any nation, and were variously called the Chasse-Partie, Charter Party, Custom of the Coast, or Jamaica Discipline.  In retrospect, these became known as the Pirate's Code. Pirate articles varied from one captain to another, and sometimes even from one voyage to another, but they were generally alike in including provisions for discipline, specifications for each crewmate's share of treasure, and compensation for the injured.

Each crew member was asked to sign or make his mark on the articles, then swear an oath of allegiance or honour. The oath was sometimes taken on a Bible, but John Phillips' men, lacking a Bible, swore on an axe. Legend suggests that other pirates swore on crossed pistols, swords, on a human skull, or astride a cannon. This act formally inducted the signer into the pirate crew, generally entitling him to vote for officers and on other "affairs of moment", to bear arms, and to his share of the plunder. The articles having been signed, they were then posted in a prominent place, often the door to the captain's cabin.

After a piratical cruise began, new recruits from captured ships would sometimes sign the articles, in some cases voluntarily, in other cases under threat of torture or death. Valuable sea artisans, such as carpenters and navigators, were especially likely to be forced to sign articles under duress, and would rarely be released regardless of their decision to sign or not. In some cases, even willing recruits would ask the pirates to pretend to force them to sign, so that they could plead they were forced should they ever be captured by the law. Generally, men who had not signed the articles had a much better chance of acquittal at trial if captured by the law.

Pirate articles are closely related to, and were derived from, ship's articles of the time, especially those of privateers, which similarly provided for discipline and regulated distribution of booty (though usually far less equally than with pirate articles).  Merchant articles and privateering articles can be traced back to Europe in the Middle Ages when there was a system of "joint hands" agreements between merchants, owners, and seamen to share profits.

Examples
Nine complete or nearly complete sets of piratical articles have survived, chiefly from Charles Johnson's A General History of the Pyrates, first published in 1724, and from records kept by Admiralty Court proceedings at the trials of pirates. A partial code from Henry Morgan is preserved in Alexandre Exquemelin's 1678 book The Buccaneers of America. Many other pirates are known to have had articles; the late-17th century Articles of George Cusack and Nicholas Clough have also survived intact. Part of the reason that few pirate articles have survived is that  pirates on the verge of capture or surrender often burned their articles or threw them overboard to prevent the papers being used against them at trial.

Articles of Bartholomew Roberts
Bartholomew Roberts' Articles were similar (but not identical) to those of his former Captain, Howell Davis. In turn, Roberts' Articles influenced those of pirates such as Thomas Anstis who served under him and later went their own way.

Articles of John Phillips
Captain John Phillips, captain of the Revenge, also set a code for his men in 1724:

Articles of Edward Low and George Lowther
The articles listed below are attributed by the Boston News-Letter to Captain Edward Low.  The first eight of these articles are essentially identical to those attributed to pirate captain George Lowther by Charles Johnson.  Since Lowther and Low are known to have sailed together from about New Year's to May 28, 1722, it is probable that both reports are correct and that Low and Lowther shared the same articles, with Low's two extra articles being an ordinance, or amendment, adopted after the two crews separated.

Articles of John Gow
A set of articles written in John Gow's own hand was found aboard his ship, the Revenge (née George), in 1729.   Article IV's reference to no going ashore "till the ship is off the ground" suggests that the Revenge was already grounded when the articles were written, only days before Gow and his men were captured.  The code states as follows:

Articles of Henry Morgan and other buccaneers
Exquemelin writes in general terms about the articles of late 17th century Caribbean buccaneers. Although he does not attribute these articles to any specific buccaneer captain, Exquemelin almost certainly sailed with Henry Morgan as a physician, and thus his account likely reflects Morgan's articles more accurately than any other privateer or buccaneer of the time.

Exquemelin writes that the buccaneers "agree on certain articles, which are put in writing, by way of bond or obligation, which every one is bound to observe, and all of them, or the chief, set their hands to it." Although Exquemelin does not number the articles, the following approximately reflects his description of the buccaneers' laws:

See also
Richard Taylor, another Golden Age pirate whose Articles were recorded by witnesses
Parley, part of the code according to the Pirates of the Caribbean (film series).
Distribution of justice
Ching Shih
Governance in 18th-century piracy
Piracy in the Caribbean
Pirates in popular culture

References

External links
Really Bad Eggs: Pirates of the Caribbean

Fictional books
Codes of conduct
Pirate customs and traditions
Contract law
Warrior code